James Turnbull (1911–1992) was a Scottish professional footballer who played as an inside left in the Scottish League for Cowdenbeath, Rangers and East Stirlingshire.

Career 
Turnbull played as an inside left in the Scottish League for Cowdenbeath, Rangers and East Stirlingshire. He also played non-League football in England and Wales. Turnbull won the Scottish Cup with Rangers in 1936 and played a small role (six appearances, one goal) in the club's Scottish League victory in 1938–39, before his career was interrupted by World War II.

Career statistics

Honours 
East Stirlingshire
 Scottish League Division Two: 1931–32

Rangers
 Scottish Cup: 1935–36
 Glasgow Cup: 1937–38

Individual
Cowdenbeath Hall of Fame

References 

1911 births
Date of birth missing
1992 deaths
Date of death missing
Scottish footballers
Footballers from Fife
People from Kelty
Cowdenbeath F.C. players
Scottish Junior Football Association players
Scottish Football League players
Association football inside forwards
East Stirlingshire F.C. players
Rhyl F.C. players
Workington A.F.C. players
Rangers F.C. players